Sarawakodendron is a genus of plants in the family Celastraceae. The sole species in the genus is Sarawakodendron filamentosum, a tree endemic to Borneo where it is confined to Sarawak.

References

 
Celastrales genera
Monotypic rosid genera
Taxonomy articles created by Polbot